Learning pathway is described as the chosen route taken by a learner through a range of (commonly) e-learning activities, which allows them to build knowledge progressively. With learning pathways, the control of choice moves away from the tutor to the learner. "The sequence of intermediate steps from preconceptions to target model form what Scott (1991) and Niedderer and Goldberg (1995) have called a learning pathway. For any particular topic, such a pathway would provide both a theory of instruction and a guideline for teachers and curriculum developers".

Interactive courseware aids learners to access information and tools by which they can construct personalized transitions between the information to be accessed and their own cognitive structures. The process of navigation enables learners to experience the content of interactive courseware. Learning pathways also reveal the learning trails while learners traverse any interactive environment. Since learners have unique knowledge structures based upon their experiences and abilities, the ways that they choose to access, interact, and interrelate messages in interactive courseware also vary. Studies on pathways help us to explore and explain human behaviors during learning processes.

Another well-known definition of a learning path is defined by the Learning Paths methodology for employee training developed by Jim Williams and Steve Rosenbaum, which uses a performance improvement approach to learning and defines a learning path as the ideal sequence of learning activities that drives employees to reach proficiency in their job in the shortest possible time. In the Learning Paths methodology, a learning path is created for the entire job done by an employee. By looking at learning as a complete process rather than a single event, a learning path enables employers and employees to find new ways to drive out time, waste, and variability in training, which leads to improved results and reduced costs. Learning paths have been proven to reduce time to proficiency by 30 to 50%.

See also
 Learning management system
 Wiki rabbit hole

References

Sources

External links
"Learning Paths: Accelerating the Speed to Proficiency" by Pat Alvarado, 16 January 2015

Educational technology
E-learning